Petrel Lagoon ( or ) is a coastal lagoon located in Pichilemu beach, Chile, in front of Pichilemu railway station.

It contains a high percentage of sea water, and it was formerly one of the main attractions of Pichilemu.

It is named after the hacienda San Antonio de Petrel, located nearby Pichilemu.

References

Lagoons of Chile
Pichilemu